Wando High School (often shortened to "Wando") is a public high school within the Charleston County School District, located in Mt. Pleasant, South Carolina, United States.  The school serves students living in Mount Pleasant and other suburban portions of eastern Charleston County.  Established in 1973, the school was re-built in 2004 to accommodate the town's rapid growth during the 1990s.

History
Wando High School takes its name from the nearby Wando River, a major tributary of the Cooper River that divides Charleston and Mount Pleasant.  The school opened in 1973 shortly after desegregation was completed in Charleston County.

In 2004, the new facility at 1000 Warrior Way in Mount Pleasant opened its doors.  In 2009, principal Lucy Beckham was named the 2010 MetLife/National Association of Secondary School Principals (NASSP) National Secondary Principal of the Year. This is classified as the highest honor in the nation specifically for secondary school principals.

After the new campus was completed, the old campus became a temporary home for other local schools while they rebuilt their primary campuses, starting with Moultrie Middle School from 2006–2009. In 2010 Charleston County leased part of the property to Buist Academy.  When Buist completed its new downtown campus, its place on the old campus was taken by Jennie Moore Elementary.  This arrangement continued until the 2014–2015 school year, for which both Laing and Jennie Moore moved into their new facilities a few miles away.  Demolition of the old historical campus was completed in the fall of 2016.  Today, the only remnant of the old campus is the football stadium, which was used by the Wando football team until the new stadium opened at the school in fall 2018.

Academics
Wando High School is accredited with the Southern Association of Colleges and Schools.

Notable alumni 
Amanda Baker, actress
Dexter Coakley, former NFL linebacker and 3x Pro Bowl selection
Shepard Fairey, contemporary street artist, graphic designer, activist, illustrator and founder of OBEY Clothing
Travis Jervey, former NFL running back, 1x Pro Bowl selection, and Super Bowl XXXI champion with the Green Bay Packers
Brooke Mosteller, Miss South Carolina 2013
Gimel President, NFL linebacker
Barry Richardson, former NFL offensive tackle
Melanie Thornton, pop singer
Hannah Betfort, American Soccer Player for Portland Thorns FC

References

External links

Public high schools in South Carolina
Schools in Charleston County, South Carolina
Mount Pleasant, South Carolina